Michael Gilfedder (1866–1948) was a New Zealand politician of the Liberal Party.

In 1905, he stood unsuccessfully for the  electorate. Gilfedder was also a judge of the Native Land Court from 1907 to 1933 when he retired.

Notes

References

1866 births
1948 deaths
New Zealand Liberal Party MPs
Members of the New Zealand House of Representatives
New Zealand MPs for South Island electorates
Unsuccessful candidates in the 1902 New Zealand general election
Unsuccessful candidates in the 1905 New Zealand general election
19th-century New Zealand politicians